Kongkham Robindro Singh is a Bharatiya Janata Party politician from Manipur. He has been elected in Manipur Legislative Assembly election in 2017 from Mayang Imphal constituency as candidate of Bharatiya Janata Party. He is current deputy speaker of Manipur Legislative Assembly.

References 

Living people
Bharatiya Janata Party politicians from Manipur
Manipur MLAs 2017–2022
Manipur MLAs 2022–2027
Year of birth missing (living people)
People from Imphal
Deputy Speakers of the Manipur Legislative Assembly